Yvonne Mignon Willering  (born 15 January 1950) is a Dutch-born New Zealand netball coach and former representative netball player. Willering played for the New Zealand national netball team – the Silver Ferns – from 1974 to 1983. She was coach of the Silver Ferns from 1997 to 2001, and coach of the Fijian national team from 2002 to 2003. 

In the 2002 Queen's Birthday and Golden Jubilee Honours, Willering was appointed an Officer of the New Zealand Order of Merit, for services to netball. In the 2019 Queen's Birthday Honours, she was elevated to Companion of the New Zealand Order of Merit, also for services to netball.

References

1950 births
Living people
New Zealand netball players
New Zealand netball coaches
Companions of the New Zealand Order of Merit
Dutch emigrants to New Zealand
New Zealand national netball team coaches
ANZ Championship coaches
1975 World Netball Championships players
1979 World Netball Championships players
1983 World Netball Championships players
Northern Mystics coaches
National Bank Cup coaches